Acella is a genus of gastropods belonging to the family Lymnaeidae.

The species of this genus are found in Eurasia and Northern America.

Species:

Acella gracillima 
Acella haldemani 
Acella lixianensis 
Acella sibirica 
Acella subsimilis 
Acella suptilis 
Acella transsilvanica

References

Lymnaeidae